Bay Point may refer to:
Bay Point, Monroe County, Florida, in the Florida Keys
Bay Point, Bay County, Florida, in unincorporated Bay County east of Panama City Beach